AAM may refer to:

 Aam, a hamlet in the Netherlands
 Academy of Ancient Music, a period-instrument orchestra based in Cambridge, England
 Accademia di Architettura di Mendrisio
 Active appearance model, a method for image detection, using statistical models
 Air-to-air missile, a missile fired from an aircraft to attack another aircraft
 Alliance of Automobile Manufacturers
 Alliance for Audited Media
 American Alliance of Museums, an organization for museums and associated individuals
 American Axle & Manufacturing, a supplier of automotive components
 Anti-Apartheid Movement
 Aramanik language, an extinct language of Tanzania, ISO 639-3 designation
 ASCII Adjust after Multiplication, computer instruction in Intel BCD opcodes#Multiplication
 Association for Accessible Medicines, formerly known as the Generic Pharmaceutical Association (GPhA)
 Association of Assistant Mistresses, a former British trade union
 Atmospheric angular momentum, the measure of the rotation of the atmosphere around the north–south axis of the Earth; see Day length fluctuations
 Author Accepted Manuscript
 Automatic acoustic management, a technology to reduce hard drive seek noise
 Mala Mala Airport (IATA: AAM), South Africa
 US Army Achievement Medal, awarded for meritorious service or achievement